Paul LeBlanc may refer to:

Paul LeBlanc (hairstylist) (1946–2019), Oscar-winning hairdresser
Paul LeBlanc (university president), president of Southern New Hampshire University
Paul Le Blanc (historian) (born 1947), American historian

See also
Le Blanc (surname)
Le Blanc (disambiguation)
Jean-Paul LeBlanc (born 1946), retired ice hockey player
Jean-Paul LeBlanc (politician) (born 1923), Canadian former politician
Paul Blanc (born 1937), French senator